Tommy Jacquette (also known as Tommy Halifu Jacquette) was a community activist best known as the executive director of the Watts Summer Festival.

Biography

Tommy Ray Jacquette was born on December 13, 1943, in Los Angeles, California and grew up in the Imperial Courts housing development in Watts, California. In the wake of the Watts Riots of 1965, Jacquette helped found the Watts Summer Festival to honor those who lost their lives during what he described as a "revolt" instead of a riot. "People keep calling it a riot, but we call it a revolt because it had a legitimate purpose," he said in a Los Angeles Times interview conducted four decades later.

In addition to the Watts Summer Festival, Jacquette was intimately involved in the Watts Christmas Parade, the Watts Gang Taskforce, the Wattstar Theatre and the Watts Chamber of Commerce.

References

 Elaine Brown, A Taste of Power: A Black Woman's Story, Doubleday, New York, 1992.
As of 2010 Tommy's daughter has taken over the festival.She currently is running the festival with her husband, kids and associate Pam Garrett.
After Tommy's death his daughter took over. Denise (his Daughter) runs the festival with her son, daughter, husband & associate Pam Garrett.

External links
Watts Summer Festival

1943 births
2009 deaths
Deaths from cancer in California
People from Los Angeles
American community activists